Alan Wright (born 1971) is an English football manager and former player.

Alan, Allan or Allen Wright are also the name of:
Alan Wright (cricketer) (1905–1989), English cricketer
Alan Wright (cricket administrator) (1938–2013), English cricket administrator
Allan Wright (1920–2015), British pilot
Allan Wright (farmer) (1929–2022), New Zealand farming leader and businessman
Allen Wright (1826–1885), principal chief of Choctaw Nation
Allen Wright (journalist) (1932–1997), Scottish arts critic and journalist

See also
Al Wright (disambiguation)